The Geneva Haute école de musique is a higher music education institution in Geneva, Switzerland.

Status 
The HEM is a public institution founded in 2009, but the school has its origin back to 1835. It is affiliated to the Music & Performing Arts Faculty of the University of Applied Sciences Western Switzerland (Haute école spécialisée de Suisse occidentale, HES-SO).
Its Bachelor and Master courses are fully recognized by the Swiss authorities. They are compatible with the European educative space, and well recognized abroad.
The mission of the HEM includes education at the Bachelor and Master level, artistic research, lifelong learning for professional musicians, and artistic productions.
The HEM extends its activities to a branch in Neuchâtel.

History 
The HEM stems from the Geneva Music Conservatory founded 1835 by François Bartholoni (1796-1881).
The Music & Movement Department stems from the Institute founded in 1915 by the musician and educator Emile Jaques-Dalcroze.
The Conservatoire de musique de Genève was one of the first founded in Europe. Many great artists taught there, such as
 Franz Liszt
 Ernest Bloch
 Ernest Ansermet
 Dinu Lipatti
 Nikita Magaloff
 Marcel Moyse
 Joseph Szigeti
 José Vianna da Motta
The HEM is situated in a building in Place Neuve erected in 1855 by the Parisian architect Jean-Baptiste Lesueur. 
Inside the Conservatory was founded in 1939 the Geneva International Music Competition Concours international d'exécution musicale de Genève.
The Early Music Department of the HEM stems from the Centre the musique ancienne, founded 1975 by the Conservatoire populaire de musique de Genève.
The HEM was affiliated as a Swiss Universities of Applied Sciences in 2002.

Departments 
The HEM covers all musical styles, from the Middle-Age to the Contemporary Music.
It hosts six Departments, covering all musical professions.
 Keyboard Department
 Orchestra Department
 Vocal Department
 Early Music Department
 Music and Movement Department
 Composition & Theory Department
La HEM maintains a symphonic orchestra, several chamber orchestras, a baroque orchestra, a choir, a chamber choir, a contemporary ensemble. 
It offers annually more than 500 performances : concerts, solo or ensemble recitals.

Courses 
The courses are articulated in two cycles : a three years Bachelor of Arts followed by a two years Master of Arts.
Numerous Majors and Minors are available inside the six courses :
 BA in Music
 BA in Music & Movement.
 MA in Music Pedagogy.
 MA in Music Performance.
 MA in specialized Music Performance
 MA in Music Composition & Theory
 MA in Ethnomusicology (in partnership with the University of Geneva and the University of Neuchâtel)

Partners 
The HEM is well connected to the Universities and artistic production environment in Geneva. Its collaborates closely with following partners :
 University of Geneva (exchange of teaching with the Musicology department, BA in Music & Musicology, MA in Ethnomusicology, Social and Cultural services.
 University of Neuchâtel (MA in Ethnomusicology)
 Orchestre de la Suisse Romande
 Orchestre de chambre de Genève
 Ensemble de musique contemporaine Contrechamps (orchestra internships).
 Grand Théâtre de Genève
 Geneva International Music Competition
 Kunitachi College of Music
The HEM est an active member of the Association Européenne des Conservatoires et Musikhochschulen and maintains close cooperation with numerous Institutions in Switzerland and abroad.The school is member of the Erasmus exchange program, and collaborates with sister institutions around the world, namely in United States, Canada, Venezuela, Brasil, India and China.

External links 
 Site of the HEM

References 
 Bochet, Henri : Le Conservatoire de musique de Genève: son histoire de 1835 à 1935. Genève, [s.n.], 1935.
 Jeandin, Richard : Le Conservatoire de musique de Genève : 1935-1960. Genève, [s.n.], [s.d.].
 Jeandin, Richard Anthelme : Le Conservatoire de musique de Genève : 1960-1985. Genève, Conservatoire de musique, 1985.
 Campos, Rémy : Instituer la musique : les premières années du Conservatoire de Musique de Genève : (1835-1859). Genève : Ed. Université-Conservatoire de musique, 2003.

Music schools in Switzerland
Schools in Geneva
Universities in Switzerland
Educational institutions established in 2009
2009 establishments in Switzerland